Sabashevo (Habaş) is a rural locality (a village) in Zirgansky Selsoviet, Meleuzovsky District, Bashkortostan, Russia. The population was 300 as of 2010. There are 6 streets.

Geography 
Sabashevo is located 39 km north of Meleuz (the district's administrative centre) by road. Yasheltau is the nearest rural locality.

References 

Rural localities in Meleuzovsky District